Stephanie Vaquer (born March 29, 1993) is a Chilean professional wrestler who primarily wrestles in the Consejo Mundial de Lucha Libre (CMLL). She has also wrestled in Japan for major promotions such as Stardom and Ice Ribbon.

Career
Vaquer began training in professional wrestling in February 2009 under Paul Slandering. Her first documented matches were from August 2010 at smaller events in Chile, when she went by the name Dark Angel. On December 22, 2013, she made her debut in Mexico in a match against Heroína in the Arena Coliseo Coacalco. In Mexico, she would be trained by Ricky Marvin, Último Guerrero, Gran Apache and Villano IV.

In 2018, Vaquer made her debut in Japan for the women's promotion Stardom, and wrestled five matches over three weeks from July to August, including a title match. That same year, she also wrestled for WWE in her home country when the promotion toured Chile. She began wrestling for Consejo Mundial de Lucha Libre in Mexico in August 2019 and is a seasonal recurring name there as she alternates time in Mexico with time in Japan. She was CMLL's first female South American wrestler.

Personal life
Vaquer has described Reina Dorada as her closest friend. She is 160 centimeters tall, and also has Mexican citizenship.

On March 4, 2023, she filed a domestic violence criminal complaint against Lucha Libre AAA Worldwide World Trios Champion El Cuatrero, who had worked with her in the past for CMLL. According to the complaint, Cuatrero choked her and threw her against a wall. On March 9, Consejo Mundial de Lucha Libre released a statement stating that they "energetically condemn any form of violence against women and reiterate our commitment to promote a life free of violence and harassment in our staff and attendees to our arenas." On March 10, after a show for AAA in the city of Aguascalientes, El Cuatrero was arrested on an arrest warrant in Mexico City and charged for attempted femicide and domestic violence.

Championships and accomplishments
Alianza Universal De Lucha Libre
AULL Women's Championship (1 time)

References

External links

1993 births
Living people
People from San Antonio, Chile
Chilean emigrants to Mexico
Chilean female professional wrestlers
Mexican female professional wrestlers